Reason Tour (also known as the On a Mission Tour) was the third set of concerts performed by English singer Melanie C. The tour ran from 24 April until 17 December 2003.

Setlist

Personnel 
Melanie C – Vocals
Fergus Gerrand – Drums/Musical Director
Paul Gendler – Guitar
Greg Hatwell – Guitar/Backing Vocals
Georgina 'Grog' Lisee – Bass Guitar/Backing Vocals (Leg 1)
Jenni Tarma – Bass Guitar (Leg 2)
Sarah de Courcy-Aston – Keyboards/Backing Vocals

Broadcasts and recordings 
On 9 May 2003, the Shepherd's Bush Empire concert was webcast on MelanieC.net, and has since then been uploaded to her YouTube channel. In November 2003, the Avo Session Basel concert was broadcast on 3sat.

Tour dates

References 

2003 concert tours
Melanie C concert tours
2003 in British music
Concert tours of the United Kingdom
2003 in Irish music
Concert tours of Ireland